Florimo is an Italian surname.  Notable people with this name include:

 Francesco Florimo (1800–1888), Italian librarian, musicologist, historian of music, and composer
 Greg Florimo (born 1967), Australian former professional rugby league footballer

Italian-language surnames